Caffeyl alcohol is the organic compound with the formula (HO)2C6H3-4-CHCHCH2OH.  This colourless solid is related to catechol by attachment to allyl alcohol. It is the precursor to one of the three principal lignols.

Preparation and occurrence
In the laboratory, caffeyl alcohol can be synthesized from 3,4-dihydroxybenzaldehyde.  It is an intermediate in the biosynthesis of coniferyl alcohol, the conversion being effected by caffeate O-methyltransferase.

Related compounds
Two related compounds are caffeyl aldehyde and caffeic acid, the latter also being a minor component of coffee.

References

Phenylpropanoids
Primary alcohols